An extremely devastating and deadly tornado outbreak sequence impacted the Midwestern and Northeastern United States at the beginning of June 1953. It included two tornadoes that caused at least 90 deaths each—an F5 tornado occurring in Flint, Michigan, on June 8 and an F4 tornado in Worcester, Massachusetts, on June 9. These tornadoes are among the deadliest in United States history and were caused by the same storm system that moved eastward across the nation. The tornadoes are also related together in the public mind because, for a brief period following the Worcester tornado, it was debated in the U.S. Congress whether recent atomic bomb testing in the upper atmosphere had caused the tornadoes. Congressman James E. Van Zandt (R-Penn.) was among several members of Congress who expressed their belief that the June 4th bomb testing created the tornadoes, which occurred far outside the traditional tornado alley. They demanded a response from the government. Meteorologists quickly dispelled such an assertion, and Congressman Van Zandt later retracted his statement.

The Flint-Worcester Tornadoes were the most infamous storms produced by a larger outbreak of severe weather that began in Nebraska, Iowa and Wisconsin, before moving across the Great Lakes states, and then into New York and New England. Other F3 and F4 tornadoes struck other locations in Massachusetts, Michigan, New Hampshire and Ohio.

Meteorological synopsis
On June 6, a surface low-pressure area formed over Northwestern New Mexico and eventually began to move northeastward into the Great Plains. On June 7, the low-pressure system moved into Southwestern Nebraska with a cold front extending a short distance westward into Northeastern Colorado, a dryline that extended south into Southwestern Texas, and a warm front that extended east-northeastward to near Omaha, Nebraska before turning east-southeastward into Southwestern Indiana. Temperatures across Kansas, Nebraska, and Iowa that afternoon in the area were up in the upper 70s to lower 90s while dewpoints were in the lower 60s to lower 70s. With shear values of 55 knots in the upper atmosphere, the environment became extremely ripe for the development of severe weather and tornadoes throughout the afternoon and evening. A jet streak formed later that night after an upper-level low formed, which allowed the outbreak to go well into the overnight hours.

By June 8, the surface low and upper-level low had moved into Canada. The surface low occluded with the warm front over the Eastern Great Lakes into Ontario and New York and the cold front extending southwestward into Southeastern Iowa. A surface boundary formed, spanning from Eastern Upper Michigan southwestward into Southwestern Illinois. Upper-level wind shear values were even stronger on this day, reaching as high as 65 knots. Temperatures were in upper 70s to upper 80s with dewpoints in the mid 60s to mid 70s. This allowed for a line of violent tornadic supercells to form across Eastern Lower Michigan into Northwestern Ohio. These storms marched eastward throughout the afternoon before weakening that evening.

On June 9, the cold front from the surface low over Eastern Ontario had moved into New England. A shortwave trough had formed over the region in the upper atmosphere conjuring up extremely strong wind shear values of 100 knots. At the surface, temperatures were in the upper 70s to mid 80s with dewpoints in the mid 60s to lower 70s. Numerous supercell thunderstorm formed along the cold front, spawning wind, hail, and tornadoes before weakening and moving offshore that evening.

Confirmed tornadoes

June 7 event

June 8 event

June 9 event

Flushing–Northern Flint–Beecher–Columbiaville, Michigan

This catastrophic, violent, multi-vortex F5 tornado was one of the deadliest tornadoes ever recorded in the United States, devastating the Flint, Michigan suburb of Beecher. The tornado first touched down at about 8:30 p.m. on June 8 north of Flushing, Michigan. The tornado than moved eastward along Coldwater Road, moving directly through Beecher, Michigan with little to no warning, obliterating almost every structure in its path. Large sections of neighborhoods were completely swept away, with only foundations left. Trees were debarked and vehicles were thrown and mangled and the Beecher High School was heavily damaged. Many patrons at the North Flint Drive-in theater evacuated the drive-in in their vehicles. Some got into vehicle crashes in the ensuing panic to flee while others inadvertently drove into the path of the tornado after leaving the theater. The theater itself received only minor damage. The tornado then moved east-northeastward, causing additional damaged before dissipating near Columbiaville. One hundred and sixteen were killed, making it the tenth deadliest tornado in U.S. history. The death toll was surpassed by the 2011 Joplin tornado. It is also one of only two F5 tornadoes ever to hit in Michigan. Another F5 tornado would hit in Hudsonville on April 3, 1956.

Worcester, Massachusetts

The storm system that created the Flint tornado moved eastward over southern Ontario and Lake Erie during the early morning hours of June 9. As radar was still primitive (or nonexistent) in 1953, inadequate severe weather predictions resulted. (Even during the Super Outbreak of April 3, 1974, weather radar was still not up to this task; that outbreak resulted in a technological upgrade.)  The Weather Bureau in Buffalo, New York merely predicted thunderstorms and said that "a tornado may occur." As early as 10 A.M., however, the Weather Bureau in Boston anticipated the likelihood of tornadic conditions that afternoon but feared the word "tornado" would strike panic in the public, and refrained from using it. Instead, as a compromise, they issued New England's first-ever severe thunderstorm watch.

Rain fell across Worcester County throughout the day on June 9. In New York, a strong cluster of thunderstorms began to build, moving eastward into Massachusetts. At approximately 4:25 pm (EST), a funnel cloud formed near the Quabbin Reservoir near New Salem. Very soon after, a tornado spawned from the funnel cloud, touching down in a forest outside of the rural community of Petersham. The tornado then proceeded to pass through a farm field, where it struck a farmhouse and killed two people. As the storm moved eastward at approximately 35 mph (58 km/h), it hit the towns of Rutland and Holden, where 11 people were killed in total.(Grazulis, 1993)

At about 5:00 pm, the tornado moved into the city of Worcester, alarming many residents. According to eyewitness accounts, the storm moved in extremely quickly, shocking the townsfolk. "I saw it grow noticeably darker," said eyewitness George Carlson, "Then it hit. Houses tumbled, trees fell, and it was all over. The tornado was definitely discernible. Like when you can see the lines of rain in an approaching rainstorm," he added. The tornado, which had grown to a mile (1.6 km) wide, destroyed several structures in Northern Worcester, including parts of Assumption College. Other major structures included a newly built factory and a large residential development. Residential areas were devastated, where entire rows of homes swept away at possible F5 intensity.

The funnel maintained its 1-mile width as it passed throughout much of Shrewsbury, and still did a high amount of damage when it moved through downtown Westborough, where it began curving towards the northeast in its final leg. In the storm's final moments, 3 were killed when Fayville Post Office in Southborough collapsed. Around the time it ended 5:45 pm, a tornado warning was issued, although by then it was too late.

The final death toll was 94, the highest number deaths ever recorded by an F4/EF4 tornado. 1,228 other people were injured.

1953 tornado season in perspective

The year 1953 saw some of the deadliest tornadoes in U.S. history, including the Waco tornado that hit on May 11, the Flint tornado of June 8, and the Worcester tornado on June 9. These 3 storms were also unique in occurring within a 30-day period.

Other severe tornadoes of 1953 hit Warner Robins, Georgia in April, San Angelo, Texas in May (same day as Waco), Port Huron, Michigan later in May, Cleveland in June (same day as Flint and the day before Worcester), and Vicksburg, Mississippi in December.

See also
 List of North American tornadoes and tornado outbreaks
 2011 New England tornado outbreak

References

Bibliography
 Chittick, William F. (2003). The Worcester Tornado, June 9, 1953. Bristol, RI: Private Publication.
 Chittick, William F. (2005). What Is So Rare As A Day In June: The Worcester Tornado, June 9, 1953. Bristol, RI: Multimedia Presentation.
 O'Toole, John M. (1993). Tornado! 84 minutes, 94 lives.  Worcester: Chandler House Press.

Notes

External links
 Full map of Flint-Worcester tornado outbreak Tornado History Project
 Video interview of tornado survivor (and nurse) who tended to injured
 Beecher Tornado – Flint Public Library Archive
 Beecher Tornado – Flint Journal Beecher Tornado Anniversary
 1953 Worcester Tornado Slideshow – City of Worcester
 Worcester Telegram and Gazette site on Worcester tornado
 The Worcester Tornado of 1953
 June 7–9, 1953 — The Flint – Worcester Outbreak (Shawn Schuman)
 Worcester, MA Terrible Tornado Death and Damage, June 1953 at GenDisasters.com
 Flint and Other Towns, MI and OH Tornadoes, June 1953 at GenDisasters.com
 A nurse who attended to victims describes the carnage and scene of the 1953 Flint tornado 

F5 tornadoes
Tornadoes of 1953
Tornadoes in Massachusetts
Tornadoes in Michigan
Tornadoes in Nebraska
Tornadoes in Ohio
Tornadoes in New Hampshire
1953 natural disasters in the United States
History of Worcester, Massachusetts
Flint, Michigan
June 1953 events in the United States